Apache Continuum, is a discontinued continuous integration server. It was a partner to Apache Maven, which run builds on a configurable schedule.  Much like CruiseControl, Continuum emailed developers when the build was broken, requesting that the culprit fix the problem.

The project was retired in May 2016

References

Compiling tools
Java development tools
Continuous integration
Continuum
Software using the Apache license